The Twenty-five Year Award is an architecture prize awarded each year by the American Institute of Architects (AIA) to "a building that has set a precedent for the last 25 to 35 years and continues to set standards of excellence for its architectural design and significance" and which was designed by an architect licensed in the United States. The Twenty-five Year Award was first presented in 1969, and has been handed out every year from 1971 onward, with the exception of 2018. In 2022, the prize was awarded to the Chapel of St. Ignatius in Seattle, Washington, by Steven Holl Architects.

Five buildings in New York City have received the award, the most of any city. Washington, D.C., is second with three, while Boston, Chicago, Los Angeles, and New Haven each have two. Only five buildings outside of the United States have received the award: two in London, England, and one each in Jeddah, Saudi Arabia; Barcelona, Spain; and Paris, France.

Finnish American architect Eero Saarinen designed or contributed to six buildings so honored, tied with the architectural firm of Skidmore, Owings & Merrill. Five buildings have been honored that were designed or contributed to by Louis I. Kahn; four by Frank Lloyd Wright, and three apiece by Ludwig Mies van der Rohe and the firm Pei Cobb Freed & Partners. Of the 53 projects that received this award through 2022, only three had women as contributing architects: the Eames House, the Vietnam Veterans Memorial, and the Sainsbury Wing at the National Gallery.

Eligibility
The Twenty-five Year Award can be awarded to any type of architectural project and may be either a single structure or a group of structures that compose a larger whole. Winners have included monuments, such as the Gateway Arch and Vietnam Veterans Memorial, and groupings of buildings, such as the Salk Institute for Biological Studies and Haystack Mountain School of Crafts. Most buildings nominated for this award are new structures but one winner, Faneuil Hall Marketplace, was a substantial renovation of warehouses into a festival marketplace.

For a project to be eligible to win the Twenty-five Year Award, it must have been built between 25 and 35 years before the year of the award. It must also have been designed by "an architect licensed in the United States at the time of the project’s completion". This means that the award candidate can be anywhere in the world, but must have been designed by a licensed American architect, such as the Fundació Joan Miró in Spain.

To be nominated the project must be in a "substantially completed form" as well as "in good condition". Potential candidates must not have been altered substantially since they were built. Change of use is allowed by the rules, but the "original intent" of the structure must still be intact. These changes of use include reorganization of interior space. This was taken into account with the Price Tower, which when built was a mix of offices and apartments, but when awarded, had only one apartment remaining. The award is presented at the AIA National Convention each year.

Nomination procedure

"Any AIA member, group of members, component, or Knowledge Community" is allowed to nominate a project for the Twenty-five Year Award. A project may be nominated multiple times, as long as it still complies with the eligibility requirements. Nominees are judged by today's architectural standards in their function, execution, and creativity. The project and its site are judged together, with any changes in context taken into account.

Award recipients
The "Year" column, which indicates when the building won the award, links to an article about the year's significant architectural events.

See also
 Stirling Prize

References
General

Specific

External links 
 

Architecture awards
American awards
Awards established in 1969
1969 establishments in the United States